Bainet is a commune in the Bainet Arrondissement, in the Sud-Est department of Haiti.
It has 62,300 inhabitants.

In late 1791 and early 1792, during the early Haitian Revolution, slaves in Bainet rebelled as part of the Trou Coffy uprising led by Romaine-la-Prophétesse.

The Haitian artist and photographer Gérald Bloncourt was born in Bainet.

References

Populated places in Sud-Est (department)
Communes of Haiti